The Albany Student Press or the ASP, the newspaper of the University at Albany, The State University of New York, is one of the oldest continuously published and independent college newspapers in the United States. Its current editor-in-chief is Danielle Modica and its current managing editor is Teresa Pavia.

First published monthly in 1892 as the Normal School Echo the paper would evolve into a weekly in  1916, known as the State College News. The newspaper has evolved into a comprehensive news agency with a circulation of 8,000. It is released on Tuesdays during the school year and is published by the Albany Student Press Corporation. The paper covers campus news, sports, and entertainment, and it includes opinion columns by students. It is currently digitally published via the ASP website, but was once delivered to newsstands located around the campus.

As of Fall 2022, the ASP receives club funding from the UAlbany Student Association, but continues to have no advisement or managing affiliation with the university. Club funding assists with the overall functioning and succession of the paper.

History
The State University News began publishing in the fall of 1916. From 1892 to 1916 a monthly periodical that featured student work was published under the title "The Normal School Echo". The newspaper officially changed its name to the Albany Student Press in 1963 to reflect the growing shift to a major research university.  By the 1960s, the newspaper had a growing readership, increased coverage of world, national, and state events.  The paper was published twice a week — Tuesdays and Fridays — for many years, but later switched to once a week. In the fall of 1997, the ASP launched SUNY Albany's only creative writing and arts magazine, The Fountain Pen.

In the Fall of 2011, the paper saw several changes to its design. Among the changes are a new masthead featuring the school's purple and yellow-gold colors with no logo as in years prior. There have also been changes to the fonts and layout for a much cleaner look.

In the Spring of 2021, the paper converted to a fully online publication process, through the website www.albanystudentpress.online due to funding difficulties during the pandemic.

The ASP is continuing strong, seeing a full web redesign in the Fall of 2022.

The most popular features of the paper include the Crime Blotter, which lists the past week's on-campus crime, and UA Runway, highlighting student fashion on-campus.

Editors
Editor-in-Chief: Danielle Modica

Managing Editor: Teresa Pavia

News Editor: Henry Fisher

Arts & Culture Editor: Kathryn Taleporos

Sports Editor: Christian Hince

Copy Editors: Shawn Ness, Samantha Simmons

Social Media Manager: Liv Stephani

Assist. Social Media Manager: Sophia LoRe

References

External links
The Albany Student Press
Chronological History of the University at Albany, SUNY

Student newspapers published in New York (state)
Newspapers published in Albany, New York
University at Albany, SUNY